Vladimir Vladimirovich Pushkarev (1921–1994) was a Soviet weightlifter. In 1950 he won the European middleweight title and a bronze medal at the world championships. He was the Soviet champion in 1949, 1951, 1952 and 1954, finishing second in 1946, 1948 and 1950.

References

1921 births
1994 deaths
Soviet male weightlifters
European Weightlifting Championships medalists
World Weightlifting Championships medalists